Ryan (born Joo Jong-hyuk on 29 October 1983) is a South Korean actor and singer. He's the lead vocalist of the K-pop group Paran and is also the oldest of the five members.

He graduated from Chungang University with a Major in Theater and Film.  He's fluent in English, Korean and Japanese languages.

Filmography

Film

Television series

Television show

References

External links 
 Han Cinema

1983 births
K-pop singers
Living people
Male actors from Seoul
Singers from Seoul
South Korean male idols
South Korean pop singers
South Korean male television actors
21st-century South Korean male singers